Piotr Gutman (born 30 June 1941) is a Polish boxer. He competed in the men's featherweight event at the 1964 Summer Olympics. At the 1964 Summer Olympics, he defeated Pat Fitzsimmons and Masataka Takayama before losing to Anthony Villanueva.

References

1941 births
Living people
Polish male boxers
Olympic boxers of Poland
Boxers at the 1964 Summer Olympics
Sportspeople from Zabrze
Featherweight boxers
20th-century Polish people
21st-century Polish people